Christos Mavridis (born 10 August 1998) is a professional Greek,  footballer currently playing for Apollon Smyrnis in the Superleague, as a goalkeeper.

References
http://www.fcapollon.gr/cms/10018-Player-Info.aspx?playerid=wx8BHpaUqac%3d&periodid=j7dn6-x6Bqo%253d

Living people
1998 births
Greek footballers
Association football goalkeepers
Apollon Smyrnis F.C. players